Ilya Branovets (born 16 April 1990) is a Belarusian professional footballer who plays for Slutsk.

References

External links 
 
 

1990 births
Living people
People from Slutsk
Sportspeople from Minsk Region
Belarusian footballers
Association football goalkeepers
FC Slutsk players
FC Volna Pinsk players